A Perfect Pairing is a 2022 American romantic comedy film. The film follows the story of Lola, an LA-based wine executive. Stuart McDonald directs the film and Victoria Justice stars as Lola while Adam Demos appears as Max. The film was released on May 19, 2022 on Netflix. The film is described as a fun watch made for lovers of wine and girlboss success stories.

Plot
LA-based wine executive Lola feels underappreciated by her boss Calder at Mythos, who pays no attention to her ideas. A chef, knowing of her frustration, introduces her to a little-known wine of an Australian company which has yet to go international.

Lola secretly tells her workmate Audra about the Vaughn winery, who then pitches them to their boss behind Lola's back. So, she starts up her own company and flies to Australia to secure the potential client. 

Initially signing up for their AirBNB accommodation, Lola immediately tries to pitch Hazel, who quickly turns her down. Discovering they are short a hired hand, she volunteers to work on the client's sheep farm under station boss Max to prove her moxie. 

Thrown into the manual labor, Lola's workmates haze her, and she oversteps with excessively long showers and blowing the circuit breaker. She learns to mend fences, to not mix differently tagged sheep, to load a manure spreader but after five days she has given up.

On the way into town to catch a flight, Max's truck breaks down. So, on the way back to the farm, Max tells Lola that she shouldn't give up. As she has the night to mull it over, she is inspired by a book about the farm's matriarch. Lola fixes the hot water heater, and gradually earns the trust of her fellow hired hands. 

Lola finally participates in the 'hands' evening gathering, showing she has a good singing voice. After a day she finally helps with shearing, at night she invited into the family's pool by Max. Later, he and Hazel, over a game of pool, discuss Lola's proposal to export with her company, revealing that Max is Hazel's brother. 

Lola and Max visit the Vaughn vineyard and then camp overnight. After a tour and fence-mending together, that night they finally show their feelings to one another. The next morning, Max reveals the secret that he is a Vaughn, his sister's silent partner, upsetting Lola. Feeling betrayed, on return to the sheep farm she discovers her former boss and Audra negotiating with Hazel to sign a contract to import Vaughn wines to the US. Calder tries to lure her back, but she is unwavering.

Months later, Lola is back in California now working with Audra again with her tiny wine distribution company. Max appears at Lola's wine expo stand, declares his feelings and that his winery has dropped Calder's company for hers and that he wants to be with her. They reconcile and return to Australia to celebrate station hand Sam's wedding.

Cast

 Victoria Justice as Lola Alvarez, an LA-based wine executive
 Adam Demos as Max Vaughn, the boss cocky of the station who hides his identity
 Luca Asta Sardelis as Breeze
 Craig Horner as Calder, Lola's boss
 Antonio Alvarez as Carlos Alvarez, father of Lola
 Lucy Durack as Audra, Lola's coworker
 Emily Havea as Sam
 Natalie Abbott as Kylie
 Jayden Popik as Henry
 Samantha Tolj as Hazel Vaughn (credited as Samantha Cain)

Production
The film was shot in Queensland, Australia and was produced by Hoodlum Entertainment in collaboration with Screen Australia. The film was supported by the City of Gold Coast and the filmmakers worked closely with the Animal Protection Agency to safeguard the animals featured in the film. In credits, the producers acknowledge the Kombumerri people of the Yugambeh language region, in which the film was shot. The screenwriters, Hilary Galanoy and Elizabeth Hackett have teamed up before in Falling Inn Love and Love, Guaranteed.

Reception
 Film critic Aurora Amidon wrote that the film contains the hallmarks of a successful Hallmark film. She described Lola as a "refreshingly inspirational female character". The film shares its title with a Hallmark film, ("The Perfect Pairing") that was released earlier the same year. The scene of singalong to "Are You Gonna Be My Girl" by Jet is characterized as visual panache. Screen Rant reviewed the film as it may not "stand out to most but its aura is enough to warrant a watch." The film received some criticism as well. Natasha Alvar wrote the conversations are a "snooze fest" and minor characters are not very interesting.

References

External links
 
 
 
 

2022 films
2022 romantic comedy films
American romantic comedy films
Films scored by Nerida Tyson-Chew
Films set in Australia
Films set on farms
Films shot in Australia
English-language Netflix original films
2020s English-language films
2020s American films